Max Meech (25 October 1914 – 27 June 1977) was a New Zealand cricketer. He played in two first-class matches for Wellington in 1946/47.

See also
 List of Wellington representative cricketers

References

External links
 

1914 births
1977 deaths
New Zealand cricketers
Wellington cricketers
Cricketers from Wellington City